United States participated at the 2015 Summer Universiade in Gwangju, South Korea. The men's basketball team was represented by the Kansas Jayhawks.

Medal summary

Medal by sports

Medalists

Participants

Basketball

Men's tournament

Group play

|}

Women Tournament

Group play

|}

Gold medal match

Water polo

Men Tournament 

Group play

Quarter finals

Semi finals

3rd place match

References
 Country overview: United States on the official website

2015 in American sports
Nations at the 2015 Summer Universiade
2015